This is a list of megaliths.

Armenia
Zorats Karer, Syunik, Armenia

Bulgaria
Related to quartz-bearing rocks (granite; gneiss): in the Sakar and Strandja Mountains; Sredna Gora Mountain (Buzovgrad).
Ovcharovo, Haskovo Province in Sakar
Pobit Kamak, Pazardzhik Province in the Rhodopes
 Belintash, Rhodopi Region, Plovdiv District
 Begliktash, Burgas District
 Garlo Nuraghe, Pernik District
 Tatul, Kardzhali District
 Ostrusha mound, Shipka (town), Stara Zagora Province

Czech Republic

Dolní Chabry
Drahomyšl
Družec
Horoměřice
Jemníky
Kersko
Klobuky, Central Bohemia, some 25 km NW of Prague - GPS:  N50°18'4.49", E13°59'4.23". Known as Kamenný pastýř (Stone shepherd), it is the tallest of Czech menhirs, over 3 m (10 ft) tall.
Klůček
Ledce
Louny (Selibice)
Libenice
Orasice
Slaný
Slavětín
Tuchlovice
Vinařice
Žatec (Březno)

France
 Carnac stones, Brittany
 La Noce de Pierres, Brittany
 Filitosa, Corsica
 Saint-Sulpice-de-Faleyrens, Gironde
 Cham des Bondons, Lozère
 Peyre Quillade stones, Ariège

Germany
 Gollenstein, Blieskastel (6.6 m high)
 Spellenstein, St. Ingbert (5 m high)
 Mittelbrunn, Rhineland-Palz

Indonesia
 Cipari
 Gunung Padang
 Lebak Cibedug
 Pokekea
 Pugung Raharjo

Ireland
 Ardgroom
 Beenalaght
 Bohonagh
 Drombeg
 Eightercua
 Glantane east
 Knocknakilla
 Reask

Israel 
 Atlit Yam drowned stone semicircle

Italy
 Menhirs Valley - ozieri, Sardinia
 Goni, Sardinia
 Lugnacco North West Italy.

Malta
 Kercem - Gozo Dawwara standing stone.
 Kirkop
 Qala - Gozo
 Wied Ghomar - Rabat
 Xemxija

The Netherlands
In the Netherlands megaliths were created with erratics from glaciers in the northeastern part of the country. These megaliths are locally known as hunebedden (hunebeds) and are usually dolmens. Parts of 53 of these hunebeds are known to exist on their original locations.

The different hunebeds are differentiated by province and number. "D" means Drenthe, "G" means Groningen, "O" means Overijssel and "F" means Friesland.

 D1 north of Steenbergen
 D2 in Westervelde
 D3 and D4 (aside of one another) in Midlaren
 D5 north of Zeijen
 D6 in Tynaarlo
 D7 southeast of Schipborg
 D8 north of Anloo 
 D9 in Annen
 D10 north of Gasteren
 D11 south of Anloo
 D12 west of Eext
 D13 in the western quarter of Eext
 D14 south of Eext (Eexterhalte)
 D15 north of Loon
 D16 northwest of Balloo
 D17 and D18 (close to one another) in Rolde
 D19 and D20 (aside of one another) in Drouwen
 D21 and D22 (aside of one another) west of Bronneger (slightly west of D23, D24 and D25)
 D23 D24 and D25 (close to one another) west of Bronneger (slightly east of D21 and D22)
 D26 in between Drouwen and Borger (Drouwenerveld)
 D27 in Borger
 D28 and D29 (aside of one another) east of Borger
 D30 northwest of Exloo
 D31 south of Exloo
 D32 northwest of Odoorn
 D34 west of Valthe
 D35 southwest of Valthe
 D36 and D37 (aside of one another) south of Valthe
 D38, D39 and D40 (aside of one another) north of Emmen (Emmerveld)
 D41 in northern Emmen
 D42 north of Westenesch and west of Emmen
 D43 west of Emmen (Schimmeres)
 D44 in Westenesch west of Emmen
 D45 in the forest of Emmerdennen in Emmen
 D46 and D47 (close to one another) in Angelslo within Emmen
 D49 southeast of Schoonoord, Coevorden: known as Papeloze Kerk (Popeless Church, with "Pope" referring to a local cleric/priest)
 D50 and D51 northeast of Noord-Sleen
 D52 northeast of Diever
 D53 and D54 (close to one another) northwest of Havelte
 G1 southwest of Noordlaren

There are also many known hunebeds which disappeared due to different types of activities. They are usually referred to with the number of a nearby existing hunebed and differentiated by lower case letters.

 D6a in Tynaarlo 
 D8a north of Anloo 
 D8b north of Anloo 
 D13a west of Eext: removed and dug away by the owner of the land in 1923 (being enthusiastic about the finds)
 D13b west of Eext
 D13c west of Eext
 D31a south of Exloo (Zuiderveld): boulders removed in between 1855 and 1875
 D32a northwest of Odoorn: last visible remains removed/destroyed in the 19th century
 D32c northwest of Odoorn: last visible remains removed/destroyed in the 19th century
 D32d northwest of Odoorn: possibly destroyed in the early 19th century
 D33 west of Valthe (north of D34): already badly preserved, its last boulders were removed during archaeological research of the 1950s
 D35a southwest of Valthe: on the basis of personal accounts destroyed in the 1870s
 D37a west of Weerdinge and north of Emmen (Valtherbos): excavated in 1837 and destroyed in the period thereafter 
 D39a north of Emmen
 D43a west of Emmen: presumably destroyed in the 1860s or 1870s
 D44a in Emmen: destroyed due to the expansion of the city of Emmen
 D52a north of Diever and Wapse (Berkenheuvel)
 D54a southeast of Spier
 D54b east of Hooghalen (Boswachterij Hooghalen)
 D54c east of Hooghalen (Boswachterij Hooghalen)
 F1 south of Rijs (Rijsterbos): destroyed in 1849 during the construction of ditches
 G2 in/around Glimmen: destroyed in the 10th/11th century (on the basis of archaeological research)
 G3 in/around Glimmen: destroyed in the 10th/11th century (on the basis of archaeological research)
 G4 in/around Onnen
 G5 in Heveskesklooster of the former village of Heveskes in the municipality of Eemsdelta: partially destroyed due to natural causes, the other remains were moved to museum Muzeeaquarium in Delfzijl in 1987
 G6 in Heveskesklooster of the former village of Heveskes in the municipality of Eemsdelta: partially destroyed due to natural causes, the other remains were moved to museum Hunebedcentrum in Borger in 1987
 O1 northeast of Steenwijkerwold: boulders thought to be removed in the 19th century
 O2 northeast of Mander, Overijssel

Poland
 Węsiory

Portugal
Menires e cromeleques de Portugal
 Menir de Aspradantes
 Menir de Mac Abraão
 Menir de São Paio de Antas
 Menir dos Almendres
 Menires de Lavajo

Romania
 Histria Neolithic 2.5 m high

Serbia
The graves of the "Latins" and the "Jidovs" near the village Balwan (Bovan), north of Aleksinac in Serbia.

Spain
 Cova d'en Daina
 Cueva de Menga
 Naveta d'Es Tudons
 The Taula of Menorca

Sweden
 Björketorp Runestone, a menhir inscribed with runes
 Gettlinge, Öland
 Hulterstad, Öland, south of the village of Alby

Denmark 
 Jelling

Switzerland
 Menhirs in Grandson, Yverdon and Concise

Turkey  
 Göbekli Tepe
 Gürcütepe
 Mount Nemrut
 Nevalı Çori
 Obelisk of Theodosius

United Kingdom

England
 Rudston Monolith, Rudston, Yorkshire
 The Devil's Arrows, Boroughbridge, Yorkshire
 Drizzlecombe, Dartmoor
 Beardown Man, Dartmoor
 Laughter Tor, near Two Bridges, Dartmoor
 Goonhilly Downs, Cornwall
 Five Kings, Upper Coquerdale, Northumberland
 The Rollright Stones King Stone, Long Compton, Oxfordshire/Warwickshire border

Scotland
Callanish, Isle of Lewis
Clach an Trushal, Ballantrushal, Lewis.
Cuff Hill, near Beith, North Ayrshire.
Draffen, Stewarton, East Ayrshire.
Drybridge, North Ayrshire. 
Gigha, Argyll and Bute.
Granny Kempock Stone, Gourock, Inverclyde
Lochmaben Stone, Dumfries.
Machrie Moor Stone Circles, Isle of Arran.
Millport on Cumbrae, Firth of Clyde.

Wales
Bryn Dyfrydog Stone, Anglesey
Clorach Stone, Anglesey
Cremlyn Stones, Anglesey
Harold's Stones, Trelleck, Monmouthshire
Hirdre-Faig, Anglesey
Llanddona, Anglesey
Llandegfan, Anglesey
Llandonna Stone, Anglesey
Lledwigan Stone, Anglesey
Maen Chwyf, Rhosybol, Anglesey
Maen Llech Gwern Farwydd, Anglesey
Maenaddwyn Stone, Anglesey
Ynys Fawr Stone, Anglesey

See also
Menhir

Other lists
List of megalithic sites
List of tallest statues
List of statues
List of colossal sculpture in situ
List of archaeoastronomical sites sorted by country
List of Egyptian pyramids
List of Mesoamerican pyramids

References